Andrew Emerson Hunt (born 1968) is a Professor of History at the University of Waterloo in Canada. He is also the Director of the Tri-University Graduate Program in History.

Life
Hunt was born in Calgary, Alberta. He is a descendant of one of the founders of the University of Deseret (the original name of the University of Utah). At age one he was relocated to the United States with his American parents E. K. Hunt and Linda Hunt. Andrew has a brother, Jeff. Andrew Hunt's parents were active in the anti-war movement in the early 1970s. While a young boy, Hunt witnessed the California state convention of the Vietnam Veterans Against the War held in his family's backyard in 1972.

Andrew Hunt grew up around universities, as his father E. K. Hunt has taught at five universities. E. K. Hunt is an Emeritus Professor of Economics at the University of Utah.

Andrew Hunt was raised in California and Utah. On May 11, 1987, Hunt (then an undergraduate) was one of eight student activists protesting South African apartheid who practiced civil disobedience at a meeting of the University of Utah's Institutional Council.  The students were demanding that the university divest all of its holdings in corporations having operations in South Africa. Four of the students were arrested; all eight were charged with misdemeanors by the university. However, the students' efforts were successful as the Institutional Council voted one month later to divest.

Hunt received his B.A. from the University of Utah in 1990. In 1997 he received his Ph.D. also from the University of Utah. His Ph.D. advisor was History Professor Robert Goldberg. Hunt began teaching at the University of Waterloo the same year.

Hunt is the author of several books (see below), and is a columnist for the Waterloo Region Record where he regularly comments on politics and world affairs. Hunt has said that his research and effort for writing his first book (The Turning: A History of Vietnam Veterans Against the War) was part of his own quest "to understand the environment and the society that swept my family away and broke us apart." He is currently writing a book on Ronald Reagan and Cold War culture in the United States in the 1980s. Hunt resides in Waterloo, Ontario. He is the father of Maddox  and Aidan.

Animal rights

Hunt is a vegan and a supporter of animal rights. Hunt has written:
For about two years, I had a Blog called Andrew's Tiki Lounge: Helping Canadians (and Anyone Else Who's Interested) Make Sense of the United States...
<p>
I discontinued Andrew's Tiki Lounge. My new Blog, titled "We're All Animals," is an animal rights and vegan blog. Because I believe that animal rights is one of the most important issues confronting humanity, I have decided to turn all of my Blogging attention to this matter.

Bibliography
 
  A biography of the American radical David Dellinger.
  A novella.

See also

 E. K. Hunt - Andrew Hunt's father
 Vietnam War
 Legacy of Ronald Reagan vis-a-vis the Cold War

References

External links
Hunt's faculty profile
Hunt's profile on blogger.com
Hunt's blog "We're All Animals"
Hunt's personal website

1968 births
Living people
University of Utah alumni
Academic staff of the University of Waterloo
Canadian animal rights scholars
20th-century Canadian historians
Canadian male non-fiction writers
Writers from Calgary
Writers from Ontario
21st-century Canadian historians